Peggy Tsiang Cherng (pronounced Chur-ng, born 1947/1948) is an American billionaire businesswoman. Cherng co-founded Panda Express in 1983 and serves as the co-chief executive officer of Panda Restaurant Group. She was born in Burma (now Myanmar).  With an estimated net worth of US$1.7 billion as of 2019, Forbes reported that she is America's second richest self-made woman born outside the United States. The Cherngs invest their wealth out of their family office, the Cherng Family Trust.

Early life and education
Peggy Tsiang was born in Burma (now Myanmar), and grew up in Hong Kong. She attended Hong Kong's Clementi Secondary School, and graduated in 1966. She went to the United States to attend Baker University in Baldwin City, Kansas, where as a freshman she met her husband to be, Andrew Cherng, then a sophomore. She transferred a year later to Oregon State University, where she earned a bachelor's degree in applied mathematics in 1970. She then attended the University of Missouri, earning a master's in computer science in 1971, and a PhD in electrical engineering in 1974. She worked towards her PhD by developing a pattern-recognition program that digitized X-rays and applied algorithms to diagnose congenital heart disease. After earning her PhD, she and Andrew moved to Los Angeles where they married.

Early career

From 1975-1977, Cherng was an engineering specialist at McDonnell Douglas, where she coded battlefield simulators for the US Air Force. From 1977-1982, she was a technical engineer and software department manager at Comtal Corporation, a subsidiary of 3M.

Panda Restaurant Group

In June 1973, Andrew Cherng along with his father Ming Tsai Cherng took over a restaurant and started a new Chinese restaurant called Panda Inn in Pasadena, California, using funds from the family and a Small Business Administration loan. In 1982, Peggy Cherng left Comtal and became Operations Manager at the Panda Restaurant Group. In 1982, she built the restaurant company's computer systems to track customer feedback and streamline operations. She used computers to track inventory and re-order ingredients.

In 1983, the Cherngs opened the first Panda Express, a fast food restaurant, at the newly opened Glendale Galleria II mall in Glendale, California. The mall's developer had eaten at Panda Inn, and encouraged the Cherngs to take a place at the food court. Peggy Cherng took over as president in 1997. She was the CEO and president of Panda Restaurant Group from 1997 until 2003, and in 2004 she became co-chair and co-CEO of Panda Restaurant Group. Panda Restaurant Group bought stakes in other restaurant franchises such as Urbane Cafe, Just Salad, Uncle Tetsu, Pieology and Ippudo. As of 2018, the Cherngs still did not franchise Panda Express restaurants except in a few cases, still owning and operating all their restaurants without going public. In 2019, she is still co-CEO of Panda Express, which had over 2,200 locations.

By March 2018, the couple had a net worth of $3.3 billion. She was also #12 on America's Self-Made Women list for 2019 by Forbes. In October 2019, her development company CFT NV Developments LLC purchased land in Hawaii for $10 million. She and her husband are the Hawaii master franchisees for Raising Cane's Chicken Fingers. She is on the boards of the Los Angeles branch of the Federal Reserve Bank of San Francisco, the United Way of Los Angeles, Methodist Hospital of Arcadia and the Peter F. Drucker School of Management.

Philanthropy 
In February 2011, the Cherngs donated $2.5 million to support the Collins College of Hospitality Management at California State Polytechnic University, Pomona.

In March 2017, the California Institute of Technology announced that they were changing the name of its medical engineering department to the Andrew and Peggy Cherng Department of Medical Engineering after receiving a $30 million gift from Andrew and Peggy Cherng. In the following month, the University of Missouri announced receiving a $1.5 million gift from the Cherngs which would benefit its Honors College.

Personal life
The Cherngs have three daughters.  The oldest is chief marketing officer at Panda Express, the second daughter manages investments for the Cherng Family Trust, and the youngest works with the Panda Charitable Foundation.

In 2018, it was announced that the Cherng Family Trust purchased the former Mandarin Oriental hotel on the Las Vegas Strip and rebranded it as a Waldorf Astoria. The total acquisition price for the property was $214 million. As of November 2019, the Cherngs reside in Henderson, Nevada.

References

External links
Cherng at PandaRG.com

20th-century American businesspeople
20th-century American businesswomen
21st-century American businesspeople
21st-century American businesswomen
American billionaires
American chief executives of food industry companies
American food company founders
Baker University alumni
Businesspeople from Los Angeles
Hong Kong emigrants to the United States
Fast-food chain founders
People from Pasadena, California
University of Missouri alumni
3M people
Living people
Female billionaires
1940s births
American women chief executives